Drymaeus serperastrus is a species of  tropical air-breathing land snail, a pulmonate gastropod mollusk in the family Bulimulidae.

Distribution 
The distribution of Drymaeus serperastrus includes the following states of Mexico: Campeche, Quintana Roo, Yucatán, Veracruz, Hidalgo and Tamaulipas.

The type locality of Drymaeus serperastrus is "on the side of the road between Vera Cruz and the City of Mexico".

Description 
The radula of Drymaeus serperastrus has 127 rows of teeth. Formula of the radula is 79-1-70.

References

Drymaeus
Gastropods described in 1829